Megatypus is an extinct genus of insect of the order Meganisoptera.

References

Carboniferous insects
Meganisoptera
Prehistoric insects of North America
Prehistoric insect genera